The Graduate is a 1968 album of songs and music from the soundtrack of Mike Nichols' movie The Graduate. It includes five songs from the folk-rock duo Simon & Garfunkel, including "Mrs. Robinson", a work in progress which Simon adapted to fit the movie, along with several instrumental pieces by Dave Grusin. Released January 21 on  Columbia Masterworks, the album was produced by Teo Macero. In March of the following year, Simon and Grusin won the 1968 Grammy Award for "Best Original Score Written for a Motion Picture or Television Special". "Mrs Robinson" received the Grammy for "Record of the Year", whilst Simon & Garfunkel collected the "Best Contemporary-pop Performance, Vocal Duo or Group" award.

Although the album features two versions of "Mrs. Robinson", neither is the full version as featured on Bookends, which was composed later. The first consists of relentless, sharp guitar chords, with the "dee-de-dee-dee" sung motif, while the second includes a chorus, before tapering off as it does in the film. The other major song of the album, the 1965 hit "The Sound of Silence", is used three times in the film. Both songs have been inducted into the Grammy Hall of Fame (in 1999 and 2004 respectively).

Track listing

Personnel
 Paul Simon – lead vocals, guitar
 Art Garfunkel – lead vocals
 Dave Grusin – additional music

Charts

Certifications

References

Comedy-drama film soundtracks
Single-artist film soundtracks
Simon & Garfunkel albums
Dave Grusin soundtracks
Albums produced by Teo Macero
1968 soundtrack albums
Columbia Records soundtracks